Nigaz is a joint venture between the Russian gas company Gazprom EP International B.V. (100% affiliate of OAO Gazprom) and the Nigerian National Petroleum Corporation. Nigaz was established in 2009.
It plans to invest US$2.5 billion to build oil and gas refineries, pipelines and gas power stations in Nigeria. Launching the company, Russian president Dmitry Medvedev announced his intention to form a major energy partnership with Nigeria at a meeting in Abuja with Nigerian president Umaru Yar'Adua.

The company's name, a portmanteau of "Nigeria" and "Gazprom", attracted media attention because of its similarity to the potentially offensive word "nigga", a slang derivative and reclaimed word from "nigger", in African American Vernacular English.
The Economist said the name choice showed "a refreshing ignorance of politically incorrect language".

References

Oil and gas companies of Nigeria
Gazprom subsidiaries
Nigeria–Russia relations
Naming controversies